Imms is a surname. Notable people with the surname include:

 Augustus Daniel Imms (1880–1949), English educator and entomologist
 David Imms (born 1945), English artist and painter

See also
 Ims
 IMMS, the Institute for Marine Mammal Studies